Ron Bodoh is a master American craftsman and carver of flawless quartz crystal balls. He began producing the spheres in 1971, and had made 40 by 1974.

In 1976, Bodoh created what was then the third largest flawless quartz crystal ball in the world; it weighed almost  and sold for US$40,000 to a private collector

References

American jewellers
Year of birth missing (living people)
Living people